Tennis events were contested at the 2007 Summer Universiade in Bangkok, Thailand.

Medal summary

Medal table

See also
 Tennis at the Summer Universiade

External links
 Results
 World University Games Tennis on HickokSports.com
 Day-to-day updates about the tennis tournament at the 2007 Summer Universiade

2007
Universiade
2007 Summer Universiade